The squad listings for the CONCACAF U-20 Championship were published on 10 February 2017.

Group A

Antigua and Barbuda
Head coach:  George Warner

Notes

Canada
Head coach:  Rob Gale

Honduras
Head coach:  Carlos Tábora

Mexico
Head coach:  Marco Antonio Ruiz

Group B

Haiti
Head coach:  Wilfrid Montilas

Panama
Head coach:  Nelson Gallego

Notes

Saint Kitts and Nevis
Head coach:  Anthony Isaac

Notes

United States
Head coach:  Tab Ramos

Group C

Bermuda
Head coach:  Kyle Lightbourne

The following were called-up but replaced before the tournament began:

Costa Rica
Head coach:  Marcelo Herrera

El Salvador
Head coach:  Eduardo Lara

Trinidad and Tobago
Head coach:  Brian Williams

Notes

References

CONCACAF Under-20 Championship squads